Nadeem 'Nads' Shahid (born 23 April 1969 in Karachi, Pakistan) is a former Pakistani-born English first-class cricketer who played for Essex and Surrey. In his 148-game career as a right-handed batsman, he made 6453 	runs at 31.02 with 9 hundreds. He played in sides which won the County Championship in five different seasons: Essex in 1991 and 1992, and Surrey in 1999, 2000 and 2002.

Nads left Surrey at the end of the 2004 season and now plays for Bromley in the Shepherd Neame Premier League. It was announced on 4 March 2009, that he was leaving to run a multi-sports academy in South Africa.

External links
 

1969 births
Living people
Pakistani emigrants to the United Kingdom
Essex cricketers
Surrey cricketers
English people of Pakistani descent
English cricketers
Cricketers from Karachi
British Asian cricketers
British sportspeople of Pakistani descent
Suffolk cricketers
Test and County Cricket Board Under-25s XI cricketers